Millersburg is an unincorporated community in Jackson Township, Hamilton County, Indiana. The community was named for Peter Miller, a pioneer settler.

Geography

References

Unincorporated communities in Hamilton County, Indiana
Unincorporated communities in Indiana